Artur Frolov (born 309 July 1970) is a Ukrainian chess International Master (1991). He is a World Team Chess Championship silver medalist (1993).

Biography 
In 1986, Artur Frolov participated in the individual semi-finals of the USSR Chess Championship. In 1990, he shared 3rd place (behind Boris Alterman, together with Vladimir Kramnik) in the final of the USSR Junior Chess Championship in the U20 age group, while in 1991 he participated in the last final of the individual USSR Chess Championship, scoring 6½ points in 11 games.

Artur Frolov started competing in international chess tournaments at the end of the 1990s, achieving a number of successes, including: 1st place in Trnava (1989, tournament C), 1st place in Siófok (1990, together with István Csom), 2nd place in Alushta (1992, after Igor Novikov), shared 1st place in Mykolaiv (1993, zonal tournament, together with Aleksej Aleksandrov; in playoff Artur Frolov won 1½:½ and advanced to the tournament played in the same year in Biel Interzonal chess tournament, in which he was unsuccessful, taking a distant place,) 1st place in Groningen (1993), shared 1st place in Hlohovec (1993) and 2nd plce in Pula (1994, after Vladimir Tukmakov, together with Gyula Sax, Stanislav Savchenko, Mišo Cebalo and Krunoslav Hulak).

Artur Frolov played for Ukraine in the Chess Olympiad:
 In 1994, at second reserve board in the 31st Chess Olympiad in Moscow (+2, =5, -0).

Artur Frolov played for Ukraine in the World Team Chess Championship:
 In 1993, at second reserve board in the 3rd World Team Chess Championship in Lucerne (+0, =2, -1) and won team silver medal.

Artur Frolov three times played for chess club Donbass Alchevsk in the European Men's Chess Club Cups (1993-1995).

In 1991, Artur Frolov was awarded the FIDE International Master (IM) title. He reached his career highest chess ranking on January 1, 1995, with a score of 2545 points, and was then 15th - 17th place among Ukrainian chess players.

In 1998 Artur Frolov ended his chess player career.

References

External links

1970 births
Living people
People from Alchevsk
Chess grandmasters
Ukrainian chess players
Soviet chess players